Divis transmitting station is the main high-power UHF and BBC National FM/DAB station that serves County Antrim and parts of County Down.

History
Situated just outside Belfast, it is the primary UHF/FM main station in Northern Ireland and was originally Northern Ireland's main BBC 405-line television transmitter, coming into operation in this capacity on 21 July 1955. As such, it was the first permanent television transmitter to be established within the island of Ireland. It was built by J. L. Eve Construction, which also built the similar-height Meldrum transmitting station for north-east Scotland, at the same time.

Although one of three UHF main stations in Northern Ireland, it is the only one to feature a stayed mast; the other stations at Brougher Mountain and Limavady both utilising smaller self-supporting towers. Stayed masts are however located at the UHF relay stations at Londonderry and Strabane (respectively former BBC and ITA 405-line relays) and at Black Mountain, the former ITA 405-line (and Channel 5) main station sited adjacent to Divis. It is owned and operated by Arqiva.

The Divis station is located in a range of hills directly overlooking Belfast from the west, in an area which was controlled by the Ministry of Defence until it was sold in 2004 to the National Trust and subsequently opened to the public.  It is sited between the peaks of Divis Mountain and Black Mountain and is ironically closer to the latter than the transmitter that is named after it.

Television history
Divis was opened by the BBC on 21 July 1955 as its permanent 405-line Band I transmission facility serving Northern Ireland. It superseded the temporary station at Glencairn, which was one of two transmitters (the other being Pontop Pike) to be rushed into operation on 1 May 1953, in time for the televised Coronation of Queen Elizabeth II. Although the BBC had by this time already obtained the Divis site, the need to construct the long access road was the primary factor preventing its immediate use.

Divis was designated as a medium-power transmitter, on which type of installation the second phase of BBC Band I stations were based. In this respect, Divis was grouped with permanent installations at Meldrum, North Hessary Tor, Pontop Pike, Rowridge, Sandale and Tacolneston. Transmissions from Divis were on VHF Channel 1 at a peak output of 35 kW vision e.r.p.

In due course, a number of relay stations were established across Northern Ireland to enhance coverage from Divis, most notably at Londonderry's Sheriff's Mountain transmitter which opened in December 1957, and Brougher Mountain in County Fermanagh which opened in February 1964, the latter being the site of a future UHF main station.

In the meantime, the Independent Television Authority (ITA) built its equivalent 405-line VHF Band III station close to Divis. Located at Black Mountain quarry, less than two miles to the south-west, this came into operation on 31 October 1959 and utilised a taller 750-ft mast.

Divis became the UHF main station for Belfast and the surrounding area with BBC2 being the first regular service commencing on 18 March 1967. Colour UHF transmitters for BBC1 and ITV came into operation in September 1970.

Both this site and Black Mountain are dual ring-fenced for security.

It was announced that the 152.5m transmitter mast at Divis would be removed and replaced by a new guyed steel mast (192.7 m). This meant for a period of time there would be two broadcast masts at the site in preparation for the digital switchover in the Ulster region which occurred in October 2012. However a new 152m guyed mast has been constructed and the original mast remains to carry VHF and DAB services.

The Divis site contributes significantly to the telecommunications network for much of Northern Ireland.

Services available

Digital television

Digital television services broadcast on the following frequencies with the following powers:

Before switchover

Analogue television
Analogue television services were broadcast on the following frequencies:

All of the above channels, except TG4, were broadcast at a power of 500 kW. As well as providing direct reception for most TV viewers in Northern Ireland, all the other analogue transmitters in the province sourced their output, either directly or indirectly, from Divis. TG4, a channel operated by a state-owned body of the Republic of Ireland, was broadcast at a very low power and not relayed to any other transmitters. Channel 5 was broadcast from the nearby Black Mountain transmitting station.

Analogue radio
FM radio service broadcast on the following frequencies and with the following powers:

Digital radio
DAB radio broadcasts on the following frequency:

References

External links
 Divis Transmitting Station at mb21.co.uk
 Divis Transmitting Station at thebigtower.com

Transmitter sites in Northern Ireland
Buildings and structures in County Antrim
1955 establishments in Northern Ireland